Port of Arkhangelsk is a major seaport at Arkhangelsk, located at the mouth of the Northern Dvina River, 50 km from the Dvina Bay of the White Sea. The important point links with coastal areas of the Russian North. For much of Russia's history this was Russia's main centre of international maritime trade, conducted by the so-called Pomors ("seaside settlers") from Kholmogory.

During the Soviet period it was a major naval and submarine base of the Soviet Navy. It is still a major naval base of the Northern Fleet of the Russian Navy.

Overview
Arkhangelsk sea port sends and receives lumber, pulp, coal, machinery, metals, industrial and consumer goods. Arkhangelsk seaport - the main base of the Northern Company, performing the maritime transport of the White, Barents and Kara seas, the Northern Sea Route and overseas lines. Originate from Arkhangelsk regular passenger line to Murmansk, Dikson, Onega, Mezen, Kandalaksha and Novaya Zemlya.

As part of the port has 3 cargo area, a container terminal, shipping company "Portoflot" sea-river station. The total length of wharfage - 3.3 km. Berths allow you to take and put handle vessels with a draft of 9.2 m and a length of 175–200 m total usable area for warehousing - 292,000 m², including closed storage - 40,000 m², open tarmac - 250 000 m². Customs warehouses 2000m ². In Arkhangelsk port is the only container terminal in the North, including the open space area of 98,000 m², which can contain 5762 TEUs at the same time, including up to 200 reefer containers and 2,200 containers with dangerous goods. Bandwidth container terminal 75000 TEUs per year.

External links
 Location of vessels in the port of Arkhangelsk

References

Arkhangelsk
Buildings and structures in Arkhangelsk
Arkhangelsk